The Centennial Observatory at the Herrett Center for Arts and Science is a public astronomical observatory located at the College of Southern Idaho in Twin Falls, Idaho, United States. It opened on May 22, 2004 and features one of the world's largest fully wheelchair-accessible public telescopes.

See also 
List of observatories

References

External links

Astronomical observatories in Idaho
Public observatories
Buildings and structures in Twin Falls County, Idaho
Tourist attractions in Twin Falls County, Idaho